Ejaculation is the discharge of semen (the ejaculate; normally containing sperm) from the male reproductory tract as a result of an orgasm. It is the final stage and natural objective of male sexual stimulation, and an essential component of natural conception. In rare cases, ejaculation occurs because of prostatic disease. Ejaculation may also occur spontaneously during sleep (a nocturnal emission or "wet dream"). Anejaculation is the condition of being unable to ejaculate. Ejaculation is usually very pleasurable for men; dysejaculation is an ejaculation that is painful or uncomfortable. Retrograde ejaculation is the condition where semen travels backwards into the bladder rather than out the urethra.

Phases

Stimulation

A usual precursor to ejaculation is the sexual arousal of the male, leading to the erection of the penis, though not every arousal nor erection leads to ejaculation. Penile sexual stimulation during masturbation or vaginal, anal, oral, or non-penetrative sexual activity may provide the necessary stimulus for a man to achieve orgasm and ejaculation. With regard to intravaginal ejaculation latency time, men typically reach orgasm 5–7 minutes after the start of penile-vaginal intercourse, taking into account their desires and those of their partners, but 10 minutes is also a common intravaginal ejaculation latency time. A prolonged stimulation either through foreplay (kissing, petting and direct stimulation of erogenous zones before penetration during intercourse) or stroking (during masturbation) leads to an adequate amount of arousal and production of pre-ejaculatory fluid. While the presence of sperm in pre-ejaculatory fluid is thought to be rare, sperm from an earlier ejaculation, still present in the urethra, may be picked up by pre-ejaculatory fluid. In addition, infectious agents (including HIV) can often be present in pre-ejaculate.

Premature ejaculation is when ejaculation occurs before the desired time. If a man is unable to ejaculate in a timely manner after prolonged sexual stimulation, in spite of his desire to do so, it is called delayed ejaculation or anorgasmia. An orgasm that is not accompanied by ejaculation is known as a dry orgasm.

When a man has achieved a sufficient stimulation and orgasm, ejaculation begins. At that point, under the control of the sympathetic nervous system, semen containing sperm is produced (emission). The semen is ejected through the urethra with rhythmic contractions. These rhythmic contractions are part of the male orgasm. They are generated by the bulbospongiosus and pubococcygeus muscles under the control of a spinal reflex at the level of the spinal nerves S2–4 via the pudendal nerve. The typical male orgasm lasts several seconds.

After the start of orgasm, pulses of semen begin to flow from the urethra, reach a peak discharge and then diminish in flow. The typical orgasm consists of 10 to 15 contractions, although the man is unlikely to be consciously aware of that many. Once the first contraction has taken place, ejaculation will continue to completion as an involuntary process. At this stage, ejaculation cannot be stopped. The rate of contractions gradually slows during the orgasm. Initial contractions occur at an average interval of 0.6 seconds with an increasing increment of 0.1 seconds per contraction. Contractions of most men proceed at regular rhythmic intervals for the duration of the orgasm. Many men also experience additional irregular contractions at the conclusion of the orgasm.

Ejaculation usually begins during the first or second contraction of orgasm. For most men, the first ejection of semen occurs during the second contraction, while the second is typically the largest expelling 40% or more of total semen discharge. After this peak, the magnitude of semen the penis emits diminishes as the contractions begin to lessen in intensity. The muscle contractions of the orgasm can continue after ejaculation with no additional semen discharge occurring. A small sample study of seven men showed an average of 7 spurts of semen followed by an average of 10 more contractions with no semen expelled. This study also found a high correlation between number of spurts of semen and total ejaculate volume, i.e., larger semen volumes resulted from additional pulses of semen rather than larger individual spurts.

Alfred Kinsey measured the distance of ejaculation, in "some hundreds" of men. In three-quarters of men tested, ejaculate "is propelled with so little force that the liquid is not carried more than a minute distance beyond the tip of the penis." In contrast to those test subjects, Kinsey noted "In other males the semen may be propelled from a matter of some inches to a foot or two, or even as far as five or six and (rarely) eight feet".

Refractory period
Most men experience a refractory period immediately following an orgasm, during which time they are unable to achieve another erection, and a longer period again before they are capable of achieving another ejaculation. During this time a male feels a deep and often pleasurable sense of relaxation, usually felt in the groin and thighs. The duration of the refractory period varies considerably, even for a given individual. Age affects the recovery time, with younger men typically recovering faster than older men, though not universally so.

Whereas some men may have refractory periods of 15 minutes or more, some men are able to experience sexual arousal immediately after ejaculation. A short recovery period may allow partners to continue sexual play relatively uninterrupted by ejaculation. Some men may experience their penis becoming hypersensitive to stimulation after ejaculation, which can make sexual stimulation unpleasant even while they may be sexually aroused.

There are men who are able to achieve multiple orgasms, with or without the typical sequence of ejaculation and refractory period. Some of those men report not noticing refractory periods, or are able to maintain erection by "sustaining sexual activity with a full erection until they passed their refractory time for orgasm when they proceeded to have a second or third orgasm".

Volume
The force and amount of semen that will be ejected during an ejaculation will vary widely between men and may contain between 0.1 and 10 milliliters (by way of comparison, note that a teaspoon is 5 ml and a tablespoon holds 15 ml). Adult semen volume is affected by the time that has passed since the previous ejaculation; larger semen volumes are seen with greater durations of abstinence. The duration of the stimulation leading up to the ejaculation can affect the volume. Abnormally low semen volume is known as hypospermia and abnormally high semen volume is known as hyperspermia. One of the possible underlying causes of low volume or complete lack of semen is ejaculatory duct obstruction. It is normal for the amount of semen to diminish with age.

Quality

The number of sperm in an ejaculation also varies widely, depending on many factors, including the time since the last ejaculation, age, stress levels, and testosterone. Greater lengths of sexual stimulation immediately preceding ejaculation can result in higher concentrations of sperm. An unusually low sperm count, not the same as low semen volume, is known as oligospermia, and the absence of any sperm from the semen is termed azoospermia.

Development

During puberty

The first ejaculation in males often occurs about 12 months after the onset of puberty, generally through masturbation or nocturnal emission (wet dreams). This first semen volume is small. The typical ejaculation over the following three months produces less than 1 ml of semen. The semen produced during early puberty is also typically clear. After ejaculation this early semen remains jellylike and, unlike semen from mature males, fails to liquefy. A summary of semen development is shown in Table 1.

Most first ejaculations (90%) lack sperm. Of the few early ejaculations that do contain sperm, the majority of sperm (97%) lack motion. The remaining sperm (3%) have abnormal motion.

As the male proceeds through puberty, the semen develops mature characteristics with increasing quantities of normal sperm. Semen produced 12 to 14 months after the first ejaculation liquefies after a short period of time. Within 24 months of the first ejaculation, the semen volume and the quantity and characteristics of the sperm match that of adult male semen.

Ejaculate is jellylike and fails to liquefy.
Most samples liquefy. Some remain jellylike.
Ejaculate liquefies within an hour.

Control from the central nervous system
There is a central pattern generator in the spinal cord, made up of groups of spinal interneurons, that is involved in the rhythmic response of ejaculation. This is known as the spinal generator for ejaculation.

To map the neuronal activation of the brain during the ejaculatory response, researchers have studied the expression of c-Fos, a proto-oncogene expressed in neurons in response to stimulation by hormones and neurotransmitters. Expression of c-Fos in the following areas has been observed:
 medial preoptic area (MPOA)
 lateral septum, bed nucleus of the stria terminalis
paraventricular nucleus of hypothalamus (PVN)
ventromedial nucleus of the hypothalamus, medial amygdala
 ventral premammillary nuclei
ventral tegmental area
central tegmental field
mesencephalic central gray
 peripeduncular nuclei
 parvocellular subparafascicular nucleus (SPF) within the posterior thalamus

Hands-free ejaculation
Although uncommon, some men can achieve ejaculations during masturbation without any manual stimulation. Such men usually do it by tensing and flexing their abdominal and buttocks muscles along with vigorous fantasising. Others may do it by relaxing the area around the penis, which may result in harder erections especially when hyperaroused.

Perineum pressing and retrograde ejaculation
Perineum pressing results in an ejaculation which is purposefully held back by pressing on either the perineum or the urethra to force the seminal fluid to remain inside. In such a scenario, the seminal fluid stays inside the body and goes to the bladder. Some people do this to avoid making a mess by keeping all the semen inside. As a medical condition, it is called retrograde ejaculation.

Health issues
For most men, no detrimental health effects have been determined from ejaculation itself or from frequent ejaculations, though sexual activity in general can have health or psychological consequences. A small fraction of men have a disease called postorgasmic illness syndrome (POIS), which causes severe muscle pain throughout the body and other symptoms immediately following ejaculation. The symptoms last for up to a week. Some doctors speculate that the frequency of POIS "in the population may be greater than has been reported in the academic literature", and that many POIS sufferers are undiagnosed.

It is not clear whether frequent ejaculation has any effect on the risk of prostate cancer.  Two large studies examining the issue were "Ejaculation Frequency and Subsequent Risk of Prostate Cancer" and "Sexual Factors and Prostate Cancer". These suggest that frequent ejaculation after puberty offers some reduction of the risk of prostate cancer. The US study involving 29,342 US men aged 46 to 81 years suggested that "high ejaculation frequency was related to decreased risk of total prostate cancer". An Australian study involving 1,079 men with prostate cancer and 1,259 healthy men found that "there is evidence that the more frequently men ejaculate between the ages of 20 and 50, the less likely they are to develop prostate cancer":

Other animals

In mammals and birds, multiple ejaculation is commonplace. During copulation, the two sides of a short-beaked echidna's penis are used sequentially. Alternating between the two sides allows for persistent stimulation to induce ejaculation without impeding the refractory period.

In stallions, ejaculation is accompanied by a motion of the tail known as "tail flagging". When a male wolf ejaculates, his final pelvic thrust may be slightly prolonged. A male rhesus monkey usually ejaculates less than 15 seconds after sexual penetration. The first report and footage of spontaneous ejaculation in an aquatic mammal was recorded in a wild Indo-Pacific bottlenose dolphin near Mikura Island, Japan, in 2012.

In horses, sheep, and cattle, ejaculation occurs within a few seconds, but in boars, it can last for five to thirty minutes. Ejaculation in boars is stimulated when the spiral-shaped penis interlocks with the female's cervix. A mature boar can produce  of semen during one ejaculation. In llamas and alpacas, ejaculation occurs continuously during copulation.

The semen of male dogs is ejaculated in three separate phases. The last phase of a male canine’s ejaculation occurs during the copulatory tie, and contains mostly prostatic fluid.

See also

 Aspermia
 Coitus interruptus
 Coitus reservatus
 Cum shot
 Facial (sexual act)
 Fertilisation
 Hematospermia
 Insemination
 Sperm donation
 Spermatorrhea
 Testicle

References

Further reading

 
 
 
 
 

 
Andrology
Fertility
Orgasm
Urology
Mammal male reproductive system
Penis
Semen
Articles containing video clips
Men's health